Mustafa al-Khalidi (Arabic: مصطفى الخالدي) was a Palestinian politician and member of the prominent Khalidi family. Between 1938 and 1944 he became the last Palestinian-Arab mayor of Jerusalem (including West Jerusalem) who held this position coupled with real authority.

Career
Khalidi was well educated and before his involvement in politics had a career as a judge. In response to rumours of Haifa mayor Hasan Bey Shukri's perceived collaboration with Zionism, Khalidi said to Daniel Auster: "We must recognise the facts; the Zionists have migrated to this country, become citizens, have become Palestinians, and they cannot be thrown into the sea. Likewise, some of them have bought land and received deeds in exchange for money and we must recognise them. There is no point in closing our eyes about such things." Nonetheless, he was opposed to mass Jewish immigration, but was amenable to accepting limited numbers.

See also
Yasser Arafat

References

Khalidi family
Mayors of Jerusalem
Palestinian politicians
Palestinian Muslims
1944 deaths
20th-century Palestinian people